, also known as  and , is a sub-kilometer Hungaria asteroid from the inner region of the asteroid belt, approximately 350 meters in diameter. It was first observed on 16 December 2015, by the Catalina Sky Survey at Mount Lemmon Observatory in Arizona, United States.

Description

Orbit 

 is a member of the dynamical Hungaria group, which form the innermost dense concentration of bright asteroids in the Solar System. It orbits the Sun at a distance of 1.8–2.0 AU once every 2 years and 7 months (956 days). Its orbit has an eccentricity of 0.06 and an inclination of 20° with respect to the ecliptic.

Discovery 
 
Precovery images were taken by Pan-STARRS on 8 December 2015. The asteroid came to perihelion (closest approach to the Sun) around 28 December 2015.

When the asteroid was first detected and it had an observation arc less than 1 day, the asteroid was suspected of being a Near-Earth asteroid that would make a close approach to Earth on 19 December 2015. But that orbit solution used an erroneous observation from the Catalina Sky Survey causing an incorrect orbit determination. The asteroid is not a near-Earth object.

Diameter and albedo 

With an absolute magnitude of 19.2, the inner main-belt asteroid is approximately 350 meters in diameter, based on an assumed albedo of 0.3 – a typical compromise value between 0.4 and 0.2, corresponding to the Hungaria asteroids both as family and orbital group.

Inncorrect media reports 

Initial mass media reports for the size of the asteroid were incorrectly based on the assumption the asteroid was 0.02 AU from Earth and not 0.8 AU from Earth. On 31 December 2015 the asteroid received the provisional designation .

Notes

References

External links 
 
 
 

002015
Minor planet object articles (unnumbered)
Discoveries by the Catalina Sky Survey
20151216